Elías Contreras (born 7 March 1997) is an Argentine professional footballer who plays as a right midfielder for Brown de Adrogué, on loan from Independiente.

Career
Contreras' career started in the youth academy of Independiente. He signed his first professional contract with them in July 2018. On 26 June 2019, Primera B Nacional side Brown announced a loan deal had been agreed for Contreras. He made his professional debut in their 2019–20 league opener against Atlético de Rafaela on 17 August, as he replaced Fernando Enrique for the final twelve minutes of a 1–1 draw.

Contreras then had a loan spell at Temperley (October 2020 until the end of 2021), before returning to Brown de Adrogué in January 2022, once again on loan, until the end of the year.

Career statistics
.

References

External links

1997 births
Living people
Footballers from Santa Fe, Argentina
Argentine footballers
Association football midfielders
Primera Nacional players
Club Atlético Independiente footballers
Club Atlético Brown footballers
Club Atlético Temperley footballers